Chrzelice is a village in the administrative district of Gmina Biała, within Prudnik County, Opole Voivodeship, in southern Poland.

The village has a population of 654.

It is the birthplace of unicycle handball, where it was invented in the late 1970s.

History
During World War II, the Germans operated the E31 forced labour subcamp of the Stalag VIII-B/344 prisoner-of-war camp for Allied POWs in the village.

References

Villages in Prudnik County